Mar Mathew Moolakkatt (27 February 1953), an East Syriac knanaya Catholic Archbishop was born in Uzhavoor, India. Currently he is Archbishop of Knanaya Catholics of Kottayam Archeparchy, succeeding Kuriakose Kunnacherry upon his retirement, he is a member of the Order of St. Benedict. He was entrusted the whole Knanaya catholic community in 2006 January. His mother parish is St. Stephen's forane church  uzhavoor. He was the synodal commission chairman of St. Thomas apostolic seminary  Vadavathoor. He is one of the members of the permanent synod of the Syro Malabar Catholic Church

References

External links
 http://kottayamad.org/arch-bishop-of-kottayam/
 Knanaya Resources
 Mathew Moolakkattu at Catholic-Hierarchy

1953 births
Indian Benedictines
Benedictine bishops
21st-century Eastern Catholic archbishops
Archbishops of Kottayam
Living people